This is a list of newspapers in Indiana.

Daily newspapersThis is a list of daily newspapers in Indiana. For weekly, monthly or university newspapers, see List of newspapers in Indiana.
List is in order of place of publication
 Indiana Republic Times
 Anderson Herald Bulletin – Anderson
 The Herald Republican – Angola
 The Star – Auburn
 The Herald Tribune – Batesville
 Bedford Times-Mail – Bedford
 The Herald-Times – Bloomington
 Bluffton News Banner – Bluffton
 The Brazil Times – Brazil
 Jackson County Banner – Brownstown
 Chesterton Tribune – Chesterton
 Hoosier Topics – Cloverdale
 The daily Clintonian – Clinton
 The Post & Mail – Columbia City
 The Republic – Columbus
 News Examiner – Connersville
 The Corydon Democrat – Corydon
 Journal Review – Crawfordsville
 The Paper of Montgomery County – Crawfordsville
 Decatur Daily Democrat – Decatur
 News Sun & Evening Star – DeKalb County
 Carroll County Comet - Delphi
 The Dubois County Herald – Dubois County
 The Elkhart Truth – Elkhart
 Evansville Courier & Press – Evansville
 News 4U – Evansville
 The Journal Gazette – Fort Wayne
 The News-Sentinel – Fort Wayne
 The Times – Frankfort
 Daily Journal of Johnson County – Franklin
 Goshen News – Goshen
 Banner-Graphic – Greencastle
 Daily Reporter – Greenfield
 Greensburg Daily News – Greensburg
 Hartford City News-Times – Hartford City
 Herald-Press – Huntington
 Indianapolis Business Journal – Indianapolis
Indianapolis Daily Evening Gazette
 The Indianapolis Recorder – Indianapolis
 The Indianapolis Star – Indianapolis
 The Indianapolis Times - Indianapolis
 The Indy Outlook – Indianapolis
 The Herald – Jasper / Dubois County 
 Evening News and Tribune – Jeffersonville
 The News Sun – Kendallville
 Kokomo Tribune – Kokomo
 Herald-Argus – La Porte
 Journal & Courier – Lafayette
 The Daily Sun – Lebanon
 Lebanon Reporter – Lebanon
 Greene County Daily World – Linton
 Pharos-Tribune – Logansport
 Madison Courier Online – Madison
 Chronicle-Tribune – Marion
 Reporter Times – Martinsville
 Post-Tribune – Merrillville
 The News-Dispatch – Michigan City
 The Paper of Montgomery County – Montgomery County
 Herald Journal – Monticello
 The Star Press – Muncie
 Muncie Voice – Muncie
 The Times of Northwest Indiana – Munster
 The Courier-Times – New Castle
 The Farmer's Exchange – New Paris
 Newburgh Chandler Register – Newburgh
 Noblesville Daily Times – Noblesville
 Sagamore News Media – Noblesville
 Plain Dealer & Sun – North Vernon
 Paoli News-Republican – Paoli
 Peru Tribune – Peru
 The Flyer Group Newspapers – Plainfield
 Shelbyville News – Plainfield
 The Pilot News – Plymouth
 Commercial Review – Portland
 Princeton Daily Clarion – Princeton
 Palladium-Item – Richmond
 The Rochester Sentinel – Rochester
 Rushville Republican – Rushville
 Seymour Tribune – Seymour
 Shelbyville News – Shelbyville
 South Bend Tribune – South Bend
 Spencer Evening World – Spencer
 Journal of Business – Terre Haute
 Tribune-Star – Terre Haute
 Osgood Journal – Versailles
 Versailles Republican – Versailles
 Vincennes Sun-Commercial – Vincennes
 Wabash Plain Dealer – Wabash
 Times-Union – Warsaw
 Washington Times-Herald – Washington
 Times Sentinel – ZionsvilleWeekly newspapers
 El Tribuna de Indianapolis –  Indianapolis
 The Fountain County Neighbor –  Attica
 AvilLaOtto NooZ – Avilla, Indiana's first email newspaper
 Hendricks County Flyer – Avon
 Journal-Press – Aurora
 Times - Crothersville}
 Frost Illustrated – Fort Wayne
 Ink newspaper – Fort Wayne
 The Waynedale News – Fort Wayne
 The Neighbor – Fountain and Warren Counties
 The Benton Review – Fowler
 Gary Crusader – Gary
 The Franklin Township Informer – Indianapolis
 National Jewish Post and Opinion – Indianapolis
 NUVO – Indianapolis
 The Southside Times – Indianapolis
 Kendallville Mall – Kendallville
 Newton County Enterprise – Kentland
 Parke County Sentinel – Rockville 
 Kokomo Perspective – Kokomo
 Dearborn County Register – Lawrenceburg
 Mt. Vernon Democrat – Mt. Vernon
 Brown County Democrat – Nashville
 Posey County News – New Harmony
 The News-Journal – North Manchester
 Spencer County Journal Democrat – Rockport
 The Sheridan News – Sheridan
 Perry County News – Tell City
 The Review Republican – Williamsport
 The Regional News – LaCrosse
 Westville Indicator – Westville
 West Side Community News, Indianapolis, Indiana
 West Indianapolis Community News, Indianapolis, Indiana

Biweekly newspapers
 The Indiana Weekender – Indianapolis
 Mooresville Times – Mooresville
 The News-Gazette – Winchester
 The AD Paper – Columbia City

Monthly newspapers
 Aboite & About – Fort Wayne and Roanoke
 Special Edition – Greenfield
 Our Hometown News – Avilla & Noble County
 The Muncie Times – Muncie (bi-monthly)
 The Beacon – Southeastern Indiana
 The Village Sampler – Broad Ripple Village, Indianapolis, Published June 1987 - December 1998

Newspapers in languages other than English
 Makedonska Tribuna (Macedonian Tribune) – Fort Wayne (Macedonian)
 La Voz de Indiana – Indianapolis (bilingual – English and Spanish)
 Magyarsag – South Bend (Hungarian)
 El Tribuna de Indianapolis – Indianapolis (bilingual – English and Spanish)
 El Tribuna de Lafayette – Lafayette (bilingual – English and Spanish)
 El Tribuna de Fort Wayne – Fort Wayne (bilingual – English and Spanish)

University newspapers
 The Andersonian – Anderson University
 The Ball State Daily News – Ball State University
 The Butler Collegian – Butler University
 Earlham College Word – Earlham College
 The Franklin - Franklin College
 Goshen College Record – Goshen College
 Indiana Daily Student – Indiana University Bloomington
 The Campus Citizen – Indiana University Purdue University at Indianapolis (IUPUI)
 The Communicator – Indiana University Purdue University at Fort Wayne (IPFW)
 The Preface – Indiana University South Bend
 The Horizon – Indiana University Southeast
 Indiana Statesman – Indiana State University
 The Phoenix – Marian University
 Purdue Exponent – Purdue University
 The Chronicle – Purdue University Calumet
 The Irish Rover – University of Notre Dame
 The Observer – University of Notre Dame
 The Shield – University of Southern Indiana
 The Torch – Valparaiso University
 The Bachelor – Wabash College
 The Reflector – University of Indianapolis

See also

References